A list of films produced by the Tollywood (Bengali language film industry) based in Kolkata in the year 2009.

Highest-grossing
Paran Jai Jaliya Re
 Dujone
Challenge
Prem Aamar
Saat Paake Bandha

A-Z of films

References

External links
 Tollywood films of 2009 at the Internet Movie Database

2009
Lists of 2009 films by country or language
2009 in Indian cinema